The following is a list of Idaho state forests.

See also
 List of U.S. National Forests

Idaho